Cecil Toomey (4 October 1915 – 11 August 1981) was a New Zealand cricketer. He played eight first-class matches for Otago between 1939 and 1946.

See also
 List of Otago representative cricketers

References

External links
 

1915 births
1981 deaths
New Zealand cricketers
Otago cricketers
Cricketers from Dunedin
South Island cricketers